Gabonibacter timonensis  is a bacterium from the genus of Gabonibacter which has beeb isolated from the gut of a Pygmy woman.

References

External links
Type strain of Gabonibacter timonensis at BacDive -  the Bacterial Diversity Metadatabase

Bacteroidia